PaaDee (or Paadee) is a Thai restaurant in Portland, Oregon.

Description 

PaaDee is a Thai restaurant on East Burnside Street in the southeast Portland part of the Kerns neighborhood. Erin DeJesus of Eater Portland has described the menu as Thai comfort food, including noodle bowls and soups, grilled steak, pork belly, skewers, kai jiew muu sub, (Thai-style omelette), sai grog e-san (fried Northern Thai fermented rice and pork sausage), and tod mon pla (fried fish cakes with cucumber relish). The Ba Mhee Pitsanulok is an egg noodle soup with pork belly, red pork, and pork meatballs in pork broth. Brunch options include egg custard, crab congee, buttermilk pancakes with sausage and fish sauce, and "street-style" omelettes.

History 
In early 2011, Akkapong "Earl" Ninsom and partners announced plans to open the restaurant. PaaDee was under construction, as of September. The restaurant opened on November 12, and added weekend brunch service in December. PaaDee's first anniversary party saw some proceeds benefit the  Oregon Humane Society.  Amporn Khayanha served as chef, as of 2013.

PaaDee closed temporarily in 2014, during construction of Langbaan, a 24-seat Thai restaurant which opened in March 2014. For Eater's Burger Week in 2015, PaaDee served a limited number of fried chicken sandwiches with coconut cream and red curry sauce, butter lettuce, pickled vegetables, and cilantro, served on bread made by Grand Central Bakery. The restaurant was burglarized in early 2021.

Reception 
Nick Woo included PaaDee in Eater Portland's 2018 overview of "Where to Eat, Drink, and Relax on East 28th's Underrated Restaurant Row". He also included the restaurant's Ba Mhee Pitsanulok in a 2018 list of "13 Soul-Soothing Noodle Soups in Portland". In his 2018 overview of "Portland’s Incredible Southeast Asian Restaurant Scene", Woo wrote:

The website's Brooke Jackson-Glidden included the Tum and Laab in a 2020 list of "Healthy Portland Restaurant Plates That Don't Feel Like a Bummer". In 2021, Alex Frane and Michelle Lopez included PaaDee and Langbann in Eater Portland's list of "15 Portland Bars and Restaurants Slinging Boozy Slushies This Summer", in which they wrote: "In addition to enjoying some of the best Thai food in Portland, Paadee and Langbaan offer two delicious slushie drinks on its shared patio: the Langbaan Margarita — a bright blue frozen margarita made with curacao, lime leaf, lemongrass, and Thai chili — and the Paadee-Colada, a Thai twist on the piña colada with ingredients like soju and lime-leaf-infused coconut milk."

See also
 List of Thai restaurants

References

External links

 
 PaaDee at Fodor's
 PaaDee at Lonely Planet
 PaaDee at Portland Monthly
 PaaDee at Zomato

2011 establishments in Oregon
Kerns, Portland, Oregon
Restaurants established in 2011
Southeast Portland, Oregon
Thai restaurants in Portland, Oregon